William Alexander Robertson Anderson (6 September 1888 – 27 September 1928) was a Canadian cyclist. He competed in four events at the 1908 Summer Olympics. He won a bronze medal in the men's team pursuit.

References

External links
 

1888 births
1928 deaths
Canadian male cyclists
Olympic cyclists of Canada
Cyclists at the 1908 Summer Olympics
Olympic bronze medalists for Canada
Olympic medalists in cycling
Place of birth missing
Medalists at the 1908 Summer Olympics
Cyclists from Ontario
20th-century Canadian people